1940 in philosophy

Events 
 July - Jean-Paul Sartre is taken prisoner by the Germans.
 September 26 or 27 – Walter Benjamin, literary critic and writer, died at the age of 48 when he committed suicide in an effort to avoid capture by the Gestapo.

Publications 
 G. H. Hardy, A Mathematician's Apology (1940)
 Nicolai Hartmann, Der Aufbau der realen Welt (published in German in 1940; not yet translated into English)
 Arnold Gehlen, Man: His Nature and Place in the World (1940)

Births 
 May 7 - Michael Allen Fox 
 June 21 - Michael Ruse 
 July 26 - Jean-Luc Nancy
 August 20 - Jacques Bouveresse 
 November 13 - Saul Kripke 
 November 27 - Bruce Lee (died 1973)
 T. M. Scanlon (unspecified)
 Tu Weiming (unspecified)
 Fatema Mernissi (unspecified)
 Michael Jackson (unspecified)

Deaths 
 March 1 - A. H. Tammsaare (born 1878)
 May 14 - Emma Goldman (born 1869)
 August 21 - Leon Trotsky (born 1879)
 September 26 - Walter Benjamin see Events section above

References 

Philosophy
20th-century philosophy
Philosophy by year